The Ultras Malaya are a football hooligan firm associated with Malaysia national football team. The Ultras Malaya first appeared in 2007 during the campaign of AFC Asian Cup when Malaysia along with Thailand, Indonesia and Vietnam hosted the competition.

Ultras Malaya is the largest supporter club in Malaysia dedicated to the Malaysia national team. The Ultras Malaya has many members from different ethnic backgrounds, states clubs and also consisting of 14 states and other subdivisions ultras in Malaysia. Their main rivals are the fans of Indonesia national football team, where this rival was called as Nusantara derby and there have been a number of violent clashes before, during and after the derby between the two nations.

History 
Ultras Malaya also known as UM'07 originally formed by a group of Malaysian supporters including (Freddy, Black and Sky—founding members) during the 14th edition of AFC Asian Cup in 2007. The idea of this establishment was sparked in their online discussion, harimaumalaydotcom after the poor performance shown by the national team.

The culmination of the establishment of this team was when the Malaysian football team won their first title of the SEA games against Vietnam, winning the game 1–0 and the 2010 AFF Suzuki Cup competition as they claimed a 4-2 aggregate win over fierce rivals Indonesia to be the winner for the first and only time so far.

The well known and popular chants among the supporters is Warisan sung by the singer Sudirman Arshad. It used to be sung by the supporter during the early game as the "word of spirits" for the players to play their full performance.

Criticism and tension occurred when Malaysia failed to qualify for the 2018 FIFA World Cup qualification at the Shah Alam Stadium in 2015. The Ultras Malaya had provoked FAM by burning flares and firecrackers were thrown onto the field, as Malaysia trailed 1-2 behind Saudi Arabian in the stadium and caused FAM to be subject to disciplinary action from FIFA.

Ultras Malaya supporters burned flares during the international friendly match between Malaysia and the Philippines at the Selayang Municipal Council Stadium in March 2014, causing the Asian Football Confederation (AFC) to fine the Football Association of Malaysia (FAM) US$10,000 for aspects of security negligence. Before that, FAM was fined as much as US$35,000 because of the supporters' problems during the first semi-final meeting of the 2014 AFF Suzuki Cup Football Championship between Malaysia and Vietnam at Bukit Jalil National Stadium, 7 Dec 2014.

Members 
Ultras Malaya members began to increase slowly from year to year until its peak in the AFF Suzuki Cup 2014, in which membership had reached tens of thousands. UM07 membership has grown over time with the establishment of subdivisions at state and club level. The main ultras and supporters by states including:

In terms of the Ultras Malaya supporters, Capo was a leader to lead the chanting inside the stadium. The well-known Capo of Ultras Malaya is Mohd Ridzuan Ahmad (also known as Lekir Haji Ahmad).

See also 

 List of hooligan firms
 List of football clubs in Malaysia
 Malaysia national football team
 Football Association of Malaysia
 AFF Championship
 AFC Asian Cup
 Indonesia–Malaysia football rivalry

References 

Association football hooligan firms
Football in Malaysia